Esley Porterfield "Ed" McCreery (November 24, 1889 – October 19, 1960) was a Major League Baseball pitcher. He appeared in three games for the Detroit Tigers in 1914.

External links

1889 births
1960 deaths
Major League Baseball pitchers
Detroit Tigers players
Victoria Bees players
Vancouver Beavers players
Butte Miners players
Baseball players from Colorado
People from Florence, Colorado